Municipal elections took place in Rome on 3–4 October 2021 and 17–18 October 2021. Open for election were the office of Mayor of Rome and all the 48 seats of the City Council, as well as the presidents and councils of each of the fifteen municipi in which the city is divided.

Local elections in Italy are usually scheduled between 15 April and 15 June, however on 4 March 2021 the Italian government decided to postpone them to the autumn following a new spike of cases in the coronavirus pandemic.

Roberto Gualtieri, member of the Democratic Party (PD) and former minister, was elected mayor, winning in the runoff against centre-right independent Enrico Michetti with just over 60% of the vote. The incumbent mayor Virginia Raggi was defeated after failing to qualify for the runoff.

Voting system 
The voting system is used for all mayoral elections in Italy's cities with a population higher than 15,000 inhabitants. Under this system, voters express a direct choice for the mayor or an indirect choice voting for the party of the candidate's coalition. If no candidate receives 50% of votes during the first round, the top two candidates go to a second round after two weeks. The winning candidate obtains a majority bonus equal to 60% of seats. During the first round, if no candidate gets more than 50% of votes but a coalition of lists gets the majority of 50% of votes or if the mayor is elected in the first round but its coalition gets less than 40% of the valid votes, the majority bonus cannot be assigned to the coalition of the winning mayor candidate.

The election of the City Council is based on a direct choice for the candidate with a maximum of two preferential votes, each for a different gender, belonging to the same party list: the candidate with the majority of the preferences is elected. The number of the seats for each party is determined proportionally, using D'Hondt seat allocation. Only coalitions with more than 3% of votes are eligible to get any seats.

Background

Centre-left primary election
The primary election took place on 20 June 2021:

Endorsements

Roberto Gualtieri
 Monica Cirinnà (PD), Senator (2013-present)
 Enrico Letta (PD), current Secretary of the Democratic Party (2021–today) and former Prime Minister (2013–2014)
 Nicola Zingaretti (PD), President of Lazio (2013–today), former Secretary of the Democratic Party (2019–2021)

Giovanni Caudo
 Giuseppe Civati, leader of Possible (2016–2018)
 Ignazio Marino, former Mayor of Rome (2013–2015)

Parties and candidates
This is a list of the parties and their respective leaders which will participate in the election.

Opinion polls

Centre-left primary election

First round

Second round
Raggi vs. Calenda

Raggi vs. Gualtieri

Raggi vs. Michetti

Gualtieri vs. Calenda

Gualtieri vs. Michetti

Calenda vs. Michetti

Parties

Results 
In the first round, the centre-right candidate Enrico Michetti came first with 30% of the vote, and the centre-left candidate Roberto Gualtieri came second with 27% of the vote; therefore the two candidates passed on to the runoff ballot. Incumbent mayor Virginia Raggi of the M5S was defeated and came fourth with just 19% of the vote, right after the centrist candidate Carlo Calenda.

In the runoff round, Gualtieri won with above 60% of the vote.

Results in the Municipi 

Municipi are governed by a president and a council of four members who are elected by its residents every five years. The municipi frequently cross the boundaries of the traditional, non-administrative divisions of the city.

All presidents of municipi were elected at the second round. The centre-left won 14 Municipi whereas the centre-right gained only Municipio VI. Table below shows the results for each municipio with the percentage for each coalition on the second round:

Source: Municipality of Rome - Electoral Service

Declined candidates

Centre-left coalition

 Fabrizio Barca, former Minister of Regional Affairs and Territorial Cohesion (2011–2013)
 Federico Lobuono, The Young Rome (2021-present)
 Monica Cirinnà, Senator (2013-present)
 Giuseppe Conte, former Prime Minister of Italy (2018–2021)
 Enrico Letta, former Prime Minister of Italy (2013–2014)
 David Sassoli, President of the European Parliament since 2019
 Nicola Zingaretti, President of Lazio since 2013

Centre-right coalition
 Andrea Abodi, businessman
 Guido Bertolaso, head of Civil Protection (2001–2010)
 Rita dalla Chiesa, journalist
 Massimo Giletti, journalist
 General Claudio Graziano, Chairman of the European Union Military Committee since 2018
 Giorgia Meloni, leader of Brothers of Italy
 Nicola Porro, journalist

See also 
 2021 Italian local elections

References 

Rome
Rome
Elections in Rome
2021 elections in Italy